Slobomir P University (SPU)  is a private university located in Slobomir, near the city of Bijeljina, in the Republika Srpska part of Bosnia and Herzegovina. It was founded by Slobodan Pavlović, founder of Slobomir.

List of faculties 
Slobomir P University consists of six faculties:
 Academy of Arts
 Faculty of Information Technology
 Faculty of Economics and Management
 Tax Academy
 Law Faculty
 Faculty of Philology

Degrees offered
 Bachelor's degree
 Master's degree
 Doctorate

See also
 Slobomir

References

Education in Bosnia and Herzegovina
Universities in Bosnia and Herzegovina
Educational institutions established in 2003
2003 establishments in Bosnia and Herzegovina